Morgan Lewis may refer to:

Morgan Lewis (basketball), American basketball player
Morgan Lewis (governor), Governor of New York State and US Army general
Morgan Lewis (songwriter)
Morganics, hip hop artist Morgan Lewis

See also
Morgan, Lewis & Bockius, law firm
Lewis Morgan (disambiguation)